Paris Gibson (July 1, 1830December 16, 1920) was an American entrepreneur and politician.

Gibson was born in Brownfield, Maine. An 1851 graduate of Bowdoin College, he served as a member of the Montana State Senate and as a Democratic member of the United States Senate between 1901 and 1905.

Career

In 1853 he was elected to the Maine legislature. After moving to Minnesota, where he built the North Star Woolen Mill at St. Anthony's Falls, he served on the University of Minnesota Board of Regents from 1871 through 1879, and was a founding Trustee for Lakewood Cemetery. He abandoned his failed business interests in Minnesota to try his luck out West and, in 1880, paid a visit to the Great Falls of the Missouri River and quickly recognized their potential for producing hydroelectric power.

Gibson convinced his friend, railroad magnate James J. Hill, to invest in a townsite at the falls and urged that Hill extend his railroad through the new city. In 1883 the city of Great Falls, Montana, was founded.

By 1887 Hill rail lines linked Great Falls to Butte, Montana, and Helena, Montana. However, the main line of Hill's Great Northern Railway bypassed Great Falls to the north. Despite this setback, Great Falls became a major center of trade for area farmers and ranchers, and its dams on the Missouri River contributed power for ore processing and grain milling industries.

When William A. Clark resigned from the United States Senate, Gibson, a Democrat, was elected to fill the seat, and he served from March 7, 1901, until March 3, 1905. He did not seek re-election. He died in Great Falls and is buried there in Highland Cemetery.

Personal life

Paris was married to Valeria Goodenow Sweat. They had four children; two died at an early age at 1 and 2-years-old. They had two sons who lived to adulthood, Philip and Theodore.

In 1912, Philip was sent to Warm Springs, a state mental hospital in Warm Springs, Montana, for "exhaustion of paresis", sometimes known as "general paralysis of the insane," where he died. Some time later, Theodore suffered a similar health problem and was also sent to Warm Springs where he died.

Gibson House haunting
The Theo Gibson home in Great Falls was acquired in 2010 by Kelly Parks. She asserts the house, which was built in 1890, is haunted by Valeria Gibson's ghost.

References

1830 births
1920 deaths
People from Brownfield, Maine
Democratic Party United States senators from Montana
Politicians from Great Falls, Montana
Bowdoin College alumni